Lycomorphodes aurobrunnea is a moth of the family Erebidae. It was described by Christian Gibeaux in 1983. It is found in French Guinea.

References

 

Cisthenina
Moths described in 1983